Broker’s London Dry Gin is a brand of gin micro-distilled at a 200-year-old distillery located near Birmingham, England, using a traditional copper pot still.

Broker’s Gin is made with a combination of botanicals (herbs, spices and fruit). It is available in two strengths: 40% and 47% alc/vol (80 proof and 94 proof) in 1.75L, 1.0L, 750ml, 700ml and 50ml sizes.

History
Broker’s Gin was created by brothers Martin and Andy Dawson in the late 1990s. Gin is the only spirit that historically has been produced in England. For that reason, they chose a theme for the brand that would be recognised for its Englishness – a gentleman wearing a bowler hat.  Such a gentleman would typically have been a stockbroker in the City of London, hence the name “Broker’s” for the brand. Every bottle of Broker’s Gin is topped with a miniature plastic bowler hat.

Broker’s Gin is distributed across the United States and in over 40 other countries. It was introduced to the U.S. market in 2001 in partnership with Hood River Distillers, Inc.

Distilling Process
The base spirit for Broker's Gin is quadruple-distilled pure grain spirit made from English wheat. The flavour is provided by ten natural botanical ingredients, the primary one of which is juniper berries. The botanicals are steeped in the base spirit in the still for 24 hours. The spirit is then distilled a fifth and final time.

Recognition
 Gold Medal & Best Buy, 92 Points, "Exceptional," Chicago Beverage Testing Institute (2012).
 Top 20 Gin as designated by ratings aggregator Proof66.com.
 Chairman's Trophy, Extra Dry Martini, Ultimate Cocktail Challenge (2012).
 Chairman's Trophy, Aviation, Ultimate Cocktail Challenge (2012).
 Masters Award (Super Premium category), London Gin Masters (2011).

See also
 British Humour
 List of Cocktails

References

External links
 Official Website 
 McCormick Distilling Website 
 Proof66.com Reviews and Ratings for Best Gin and other Spirits 
 Independent Global Agency focusedin Asia Pacific from 2000-2009 & 2015- Present

Gin
1990s establishments in England
English brands
Distilleries in England